The Italian Athletics Championships are the national championships for clubs of athletics, organised  by the Federazione Italiana di Atletica Leggera (FIDAL), that assign every year a scudetto from 1931 (men) and from 1939 (women).

Since 2008, military sports bodies are no longer admitted to the competition, but their athletes have the liberation to participate in a civil club.

Champions
The final "A" gold of 2017 was scheduled to be held in Modena from 23 to 24 September 2017.
The final A Gold of 2021 was held in Caorle on 18-19 September 2021.

Men

Women

Multiwinners

Men
19 wins: Fiamme Gialle
12 wins: Pro Patria Milano
12 wins: Fiamme Oro Padova
6 wins: Ginnastica Gallatarese
5 wins: Atletica Riccardi

Women
15 wins: Sisport Torino
14 wins: ACSI Italia Atletica
13 wins: Snia Milano
9 wins: Snam Gas Metano

References

See also
 European Champion Clubs Cup

 

Athletics competitions in Italy
Recurring sporting events established in 1931
Club
National athletics competitions
1931 establishments in Italy